Huckaby is a surname. Notable people with the surname include:

Elizabeth Huckaby (1905–1999), educator
Hank Huckaby (1941–2021), American educator and politician
Jerry Huckaby (born 1941), retired businessman who served as a Democratic U.S. representative
Ken Huckaby (born 1971), retired catcher in Major League Baseball
Steffany Huckaby, American actress
Melissa Huckaby, American child murderer

See also
Huckabee (disambiguation)
Huckaby, Missouri, unincorporated community, United States
Mount Huckaby, ice-free, wedge-shaped mountain in western Wisconsin Range, Antarctica